Alina Ivanivna Pash (born 6 May 1993) is a Ukrainian singer and rapper. In 2016, she participated in the sixth season of the Ukrainian edition of The X Factor, placing 3rd. She also participated in Ukrainian national selection for Eurovision 2022 and won the selection.

Vidbir 2022 and subsequent withdrawal 
Pash entered Vidbir 2022 with the song "Shadows of Forgotten Ancestors". She won the competition, thus gaining the right to represent Ukraine at the Eurovision Song Contest 2022. However, after the competition, the Ukrainian broadcaster UA:PBC began investigating a trip Pash had taken to Crimea in 2015, under the suspicion that Pash had broken the law by not travelling there through Ukraine. In a statement, UA:PBC said "the artist's representative falsified a certificate provided to UA:PBC. The artist agreed with this decision of the organizing committee." Following this investigation, it was decided via a mutual agreement between the broadcaster, Vidbir's organising committee and Pash that her participation in the contest would not go ahead. Kalush Orchestra, who placed second in Vidbir 2022, were later selected to represent Ukraine at Eurovision with the song "Stefania".

References

External links
 
 YouTube
 
 

Living people
1993 births
English-language singers from Ukraine
People from Zakarpattia Oblast
Ukrainian pop singers
Ukrainian singer-songwriters
21st-century Ukrainian women singers
Ukrainian LGBT rights activists